The Mistassini dike swarm is a 2.5 billion year old Paleoproterozoic dike swarm of western Quebec, Canada. It consists of mafic dikes that were intruded in the Superior craton of the Canadian Shield.

See also
Matachewan dike swarm

References

Dike swarms
Igneous petrology of Quebec
Paleoproterozoic magmatism